Jaguar XF may refer to:

Jaguar XF (X250) (2007–2015), an executive/luxury mid-size sports sedan car
Jaguar XF (X260) (2015–present), another executive/mid-size luxury sports sedan car

XF